Qichezhan is a subdistrict and the seat of Shuangqing District in Shaoyang prefecture-level City, Hunan, China. It was one of six urban subdistricts. The subdistrict of Qichezhan  has 6 communities under its jurisdiction.

Subdivisions
 Baishouting Community
 Dongta Community
 Jianshelu Community
 Maziwa Community
 Sanyanjing Community
 Songhazipo Community

References

Shuangqing District
Subdistricts of Hunan
County seats in Hunan